BNR Newsradio (Dutch: BNR Nieuwsradio and pronounced like "BNR News-radio") is an all-news radio station in Netherlands. The station provides domestic, regional and international news with live news bulletins every half-hour.

Logos

External links 
 

Radio stations in the Netherlands
News and talk radio stations
Radio stations established in 1998
1998 establishments in the Netherlands